Pat Hayes is a computer scientist.

Pat Hay(e)s may also refer to:

Pat Hays, American lawyer and politician
Pat Hayes (Canadian politician)
Pat Hayes of American blues band, The Lamont Cranston Band
Pat Hayes of Australian alternative-rock band, Falling Joys
Pat Hayes (rower) (born 1951), American Olympic rower

See also
 Patrick Hayes (disambiguation)
Patricia Hayes (disambiguation)